Ormoc City School of Arts and Trades is an arts and trades school in Ormoc City, Leyte, the Philippines. Its predecessor Ormoc City High School was elevated into a tertiary institution with the passage of Republic Act No. 8379.

External links
 http://www.chanrobles.com/republicacts/republicactno8379.html

High schools in Leyte (province)
Ormoc